Prithvi is a 2010 Indian Kannada language action drama film directed by Jacob Varghese, produced by N.S Rajkumar, starring Puneeth Rajkumar and Parvathy in lead roles. Manikanth Kadri composed the music of the film. The movie was dubbed in Malayalam with the same title.

Plot
Prithvi Kumar is an aspiring IAS trainee, who passes his CSE examination and receives posting as DC in Bellary district. He is married to his love interest Priya and leaves for Bellary and they receive a warm welcome. Prithvi joins the office and also learn about the illegal mining and water pollution arising in the district. At the office, Prithvi is visited by an old man named Shankarappa from Sandur-Taluk, who reveals that his son Kantharaju is missing for many days, Prithvi promises to look into the matter. Meanwhile, Prithvi looks into the Eshwari mines files and is visited by Mining Federation, who bribes him with an expensive watch in the form of felicitation, Prithvi denies the offer. 

Later, Prithvi learns from Sandur-Taluk Inspector Suryaprakash that Kantharaju is actually a government surveyor and goes the Sandur-Taluk hospital, only to find that the diseases are affected by the illegal mining. Naagendra Nayak, who is the main owner of the Eahwari Mines tells Prithvi to blindly sign the file with the support of his minister brother Narasimha Nayak and Home Minister. Prithvi denies and rejects the file and sends it to Central Government, which provokes Naagendra, who destroys Prithvi's bike with a bomb, When Prithvi and Priya were at an NGO school function. Prithvi seizes the illegal mines owned by Naagendra, due to which Naagendra forms a strike with the help of people and a riot ensues where the media projects Prithvi as a Leader.

Narasimha forces the Home Minister to order Prithvi to reopen the factory, but to no avail. With the help of a reporter Basavaraj, He finds about the border dispute between Karnataka and Andhra Pradesh and the survey file is with Kantharaju. One night, Prithvi receives a call from Basavaraj, who reveals that he found Kantharaju in Ananth Nagar, Andhra Pradesh and is ready to meet him. Prithvi, along with Surya Prakash and Basavaraj meets Kantharaju, who gives the border-survey file to Prithvi and leaves. Naagendra's henchman finds out and informs it to Naagendra, who kidnaps Kantharaju. Basavaraj leaves for Bangalore, but gets kidnapped by Naagendra, who kills him and throws his severed head at Prithvi's house. 

Naagendra provokes Prithvi and they engage in hand-to-hand combat at the office where the Home Minister grants a leave to Prithvi, based on trauma. Priya, who is horrified by the events ask Prithvi that they leave the district, but Prithvi objects and tells Priya that she can leave. A dejected Priya leaves to her parents' house. Prithvi confronts Naagendra's henchman, and a battle ensues where Prithvi is knocked in the process but survives. Prithvi calls Surya Prakash and formulates a plan to destroy Naagendra. Under Prithvi's orders, Surya Prakash tells Naagendra to arrive with Kantharaju alone and will hand over the survey file. Naagendra arrives with Kantharaju and meets Prithvi where they engage in close-combat. 

Prithvi defeats Naagendra where he frees Kantharaju and buries Naagendra, along with his car in his own mining. Kantharaju, along with his wife and children reunite with Shankarappa. Priya reunites with Prithvi. Narasimha gets arrested due to the illegal mining and the mines are seized by the Government and Naagendra's name is added in the Bellary missing person case. The film ends with Prithvi taking charge as the Bellary's DC.

Cast
 Puneeth Rajkumar as Prithvi Kumar
 Parvathy as Priya, Prithvi's wife
 Srinivasa Murthy as Prithvi father
 Sathyapriya as Gowri, Prithvi's mother
 Ramesh Bhat as Priya's father
 Padmaja Rao as Priya's mother
 C. R. Simha as the Home Minister of Karnataka
 Avinash as Narasimha Nayak
 John Kokkin as Nagendra Nayak
 Sadhu Kokila as Tirupathi
 Prakash Urs
 John Vijay as Inspector Suryaprakash
 Achyuth Kumar as Sharanappa
 Shivaji Jadhav as Narayanappa
 Padma Vasanthi as Basavaraj's wife
 Mico Shivu
 Anil
 Spoorthi as Aarti, Prithvi Kumar's sister

Soundtrack

Manikanth Kadri scored the film's background music and composed its soundtrack, lyrics for which was penned by Jayant Kaikini, K. Kalyan and Kaviraj. The soundtrack album consists of six tracks. Actress and singer Shruti Haasan made her debut as a playback singer for a Kannada track with "Nenapidu Nenapidu". Saxophonist Kadri Gopalnath, also the father of the composer Manikanth Kadri, lent bits to the track "Kukkoo Kogileyinda". The album was released in Bangalore on 11 April 2010. Anand Audio distributed the album into the market.

Release
Prithvi ran for 70 days in the Sagar and Menaka and was critically acclaimed and became a commercial success in the A centers and multiplexes. However, it flopped in B and C Centres. Nonetheless, the film received  cult status after being telecasted on Udaya TV and was also dubbed in Malayalam and Telugu as Prithvi IAS.

Reception

Critical response 
Prithvi received positive reviews from critics and audience with praise towards its cast performances, direction, writing, action sequences and technical aspects. 

Shruti Indira Lakshminarayana of Rediff.com scored the film at 3.5 out of 5 stars and says "Unlike in Savari, Manikath Khadri's music does not cast a spell over you. Shruti Hassan's nenapidu nenapidu...is the only song that is likely to linger. Also some songs halt the pace of the film and could have been done away with. Prithvi is definitely a treat for Puneet fans". B S Srivani from Deccan Herald wrote "the director takes the story towards a positive end, which doesn’t affect the overall impact. His choice of actors is also sensible. Parvathi and Puneeth complement each other. John Kokin stands out, without being overtly menacing. Rajashekhar’s action is another attraction. Overall, a brilliantly made film". A critic from Bangalore Mirror wrote  "Puneeth and Parvathi share great chemistry but their interaction throughout this film is repetitive. Puneeth is never out of any scene. He seems to be there in almost every frame making the other characters look like far flung specs of mining dust. Prithvi is still worth a watch. Fans can look forward to multiple viewing" A critic from The Times of India scored the film at 3.5 out of 5 stars and says "Puneet is amazing, with excellent expressions and body language. Parvathi Menon has done an average job. Avinash shines, while John Kokin is impressive. Camera by P Sathya and music by Manikant Kadri pass the muster. Dialogues by B A Madhu and Manju Mandavya are the highlights of the movie". Renu Joseph from News18 India wrote "Only once in a while do you have a film so predictable (the storyline of a cop who cleans up the system and takes a beating but comes out victorious in the end) yet so engrossing that the audience waits to find out the layout of the next scene. The post production table let out some suave editing and treatment. A fast-paced action thriller. This one you cannot miss".

References

External links 
 

2010 films
Films set in Karnataka
Films shot in Karnataka
2010 action drama films
2010 action thriller films
2010 thriller drama films
Indian action drama films
Indian action thriller films
Indian thriller drama films
Films shot in Jordan
Films about mining
2010s Kannada-language films